Adakhan Kumsanbayevich Madumarov (born 3 September 1965) is a Kyrgyz lawyer, historian, and politician, currently the party chairman of United Kyrgyzstan, and previously served as a member of the Supreme Council of Kyrgyzstan from 1995 to 2005.

Early life and education
Adakhan Kumsanbavevich Madumarov was born on 3 September 1965 in the village of Kurshab, a town in the Osh Oblast of what was then the Kirghiz Soviet Socialist Republic in the Soviet Union. After graduating high school in Kurshab, he worked as a farmer in his home district of Uzgen.

In 1987, Madumarov attended Tver State University, and in 1992 he received a diploma of a historian-teacher of history and political science. He also became a Republican Press Minister, and then took the post as editor-in-chief of the Turk Alamy. He led an editorial on child and youth programs at the Republican State National Broadcasting Company. In 1999, Madumarov graduated from Kyrgyz National University.

Political career

Supreme Council
In the 1995 Kyrgyz parliamentary election, Adakhan Madumarov was elected to the Supreme Council, the parliament of the newly established Kyrgyz Republic. During his tenure, he led the committee on social policy, labor and veterans. He would serve in the Supreme Council until 2005.

Presidential campaigns
Madumarov unsuccessfully ran for president in 2005, 2011, 2017, and 2021.

Political positions
Madumarov opposes the constitutional reforms proposed by Sadyr Japarov. 

He does not accept the results of the 2021 Kyrgyz presidential election.

References

Kyrgyzstani politicians
1985 births
Living people